Cervelle de canut is a cheese spread or dip that is a specialty of Lyon, France.

The dish is a base of fromage blanc, seasoned with chopped herbs, shallots, salt, pepper, olive oil and vinegar. Its name literally means "silk worker's brain", after the canuts, the silk workers of 19th-century Lyon. Its name is thought to reflect the low opinion Lyon's affluent had of the weavers.

See also
 List of spreads
 Lyonnaise cuisine

Notes

French cuisine
Cheese dishes
Spreads (food)
Cuisine of Lyon